Granotoma kobelti is a species of sea snail, a marine gastropod mollusk in the family Mangeliidae.

Description
The shell much resembles that of Curtitoma trevelliana (Turton, 1834), but the body whorl is relatively larger. The sculpture is easily distinguished by the very irregular strength of the spiral lines, and the siphonal canal is also more open than in C. trevelliana. The protoconch is smooth and mammiform, and the first whorl has two spiral ribs.

Distribution
This marine species occurs in the Arctic region and off Lapland.

References

 Verkrüzen T.A. 1876. Bela Kobelti n. sp. Nachrichtsblatt der deutschen Malakozoologischen Gesellschaft. Achter Jahrgang. Mittheilungen aus dem Gebiete der Malakozoologie, 8(2): 17-18
 Kobelt, Jahrb. Mal. Gesell. 1876, pag. 178, PI. IV, fig. 5.
 Friele, Nordhavns Exp. Moll., vol. 2, 1886, p. 13, PL 8, fig. 15.

External links
  Tucker, J.K. 2004 Catalog of recent and fossil turrids (Mollusca: Gastropoda). Zootaxa 682:1–1295.
 Merkuljev A.V. (2017). Taxonomic puzzle of Propebela arctica (A. Adams, 1855) (Gastropoda, Mangeliidae) - six different species under single name. Ruthenica. 27(1): 15–30

kobelti
Gastropods described in 1876